The H.M. Customs and Excise Collection is a collection of British revenue stamps in proof or registration form for Table Water Duty, Medicine Tax, Playing Card Tax and other duties. It forms part of the British Library Philatelic Collections and was transferred to the Library by H.M. Customs & Excise in 2002.

See also
Revenue Society
Revenue stamps of the United Kingdom
Treasury Excise Correspondence Collection

References

British Library Philatelic Collections
Revenue stamps
Philately of the United Kingdom
Taxation in the United Kingdom